Iris most often refers to:

Iris (anatomy), part of the eye
Iris (mythology), a Greek goddess
Iris (plant), a genus of flowering plants
Iris (color), an ambiguous color term

Iris or IRIS may also refer to:

Arts and media

Fictional entities
 Iris (American Horror Story), an American Horror Story: Hotel character
 Iris (Fire Force), a character in the manga series Fire Force
 Iris (Mega Man), a Mega Man X4 character
 Iris, a Mega Man Battle Network character
 Iris (Pokémon)
 Iris (Pokémon anime)
 Iris, a Trolls: The Beat Goes On! character
 Sorceress Iris, a Magicians of Xanth character
 Iris, a kaiju character in Gamera 3: The Revenge of Iris
 Iris, a LoliRock character
 Iris, a Lufia II: Rise of the Sinistrals (1995) character
 Iris, a Phoenix Wright: Ace Attorney − Trials and Tribulations character
 Iris, a Ruby Gloom character
 Iris, a Taxi Driver (1976) character
 Iris Sagan, in AI: The Somnium Files

Film, television, and theatre

Film
 Iris shot, a film technique for ending a scene
 Iris (1916 film), a British silent romance
 Iris (1987 film), a Dutch film directed by Mady Saks
 Iris (2001 film), a biopic about Iris Murdoch
 Iris (2014 film), a documentary about Iris Apfel by Albert Maysles
 Iris (2016 film), a French film directed by Jalil Lespert

Stage productions
 Iris (Cirque du Soleil), a resident show in Los Angeles, California
 Iris (play), a 1901 play by the British writer Arthur Wing Pinero

Television
 Iris (TV channel), an Italian free entertainment television channel
 Iris (TV series), a 2009 South Korean espionage television drama series
 Iris II (TV series), a 2013 South Korean espionage television drama series
 Iris, The Happy Professor, a 1992 Canadian television show featuring a purple ibis

Music

Classical compositions
 Iris (opera), by Pietro Mascagni
 "Iris", chanson by Michel Lambert (1610–1696)
 "Iris", chanson by Jean-Benjamin de La Borde (1734–1794)
 Iris,  a 'dance de ballet', by Archibald Joyce (1873–1963)
 Iris, for saxophone by Tansy Davies (born 1973)

Performers
 Iris (American band), a synthpop group
 Iris (Romanian band), a heavy metal group
 Iris (Japanese band), a Japanese girl idol group
 Arc Iris, a folk pop band from Providence, Rhode Island, US

Albums
 Iris (album), by the Romanian band Iris
 Iris (EP), a 1992 EP by Miranda Sex Garden

Songs
 "Iris" (song), a 1998 song by the Goo Goo Dolls on the soundtrack City of Angels, later covered by other artists
 "Iris", a song by The Breeders on the album Pod
 "Iris", a song by Miles Davis on the 1965 album ESP
 "Iris", a song by Emmy the Great on the album Virtue
 "Iris", a song by Live on the album Throwing Copper
 "Iris", a song by Mike Posner on the album At Night, Alone
 "Iris", a song by Split Enz on the album Waiata
 "Iris (Hold Me Close)", a song by U2 on the album Songs of Innocence

Periodicals
 El Iris, a Mexican periodical published in 1826
 Sheffield Iris, an early English newspaper
 IRIS Magazine, an Irish republican magazine

Other media
 Iris (game), a Halo 3 online promotion
 Irises (painting), by Vincent Van Gogh
 Iris, Messenger of the Gods, a sculpture by Auguste Rodin

Organizations

Charitable organizations
 IRIS (radio reading service), provided by Vision Australia Radio
 Iris Fund for Prevention of Blindness, a British charity, now part of Fight for Sight
 International Resources for the Improvement of Sight, a multi-national charity

Research groups
 IRIS Consortium, a seismology research project
 IRIS Research, an Australian economic, community and industry research organisation
 Information Systems Research in Scandinavia, a non-profit organization in Scandinavia
 Institute for Research in Information and Scholarship, a Brown University program

Other organizations
 Iris Associates, an American software company, developer of Lotus Notes
 Iris Capital, a venture capital firm primarily active in Europe
 Iris Clert Gallery, a former art gallery in Paris
 Iris Ohyama, a Japanese manufacturing company
 Denso Iris, a basketball team based in Kariya, Aichi

People
 Iris (given name), a feminine given name, and a list of people so named
 Iris (artist) (born 1983), comics artist in Quebec, Canada
 Íris (footballer) (born 1945), Brazilian footballer
 Iris (singer) (born 1995), Belgian singer
 Donnie Iris (born 1943), American rock musician

Places

North America
 Iris, Prince Edward Island, a community in Canada
 Iris, West Virginia, a community in the United States
 Iris Avenue station, on the San Diego Trolley
 Iris Falls, a waterfall in Wyoming

Elsewhere
 Iris, Cluj-Napoca, a district in Romania
 Iris Bay, in South Georgia, British Overseas Territory
 Iris Bay (Dubai), a tower in the United Arab Emirates
 Glen Iris (disambiguation), several places
 River Iris, now Yeşilırmak River, a river in northern Turkey, called Iris in classical Greek
 IRIS Mist, a tower to be built in Dubai Maritime City, United Arab Emirates

Science and technology

Astronomy and spaceflight
 IRIS (astronomical software), an image processing application
 Iris (transponder), designed for use in cubesats
 7 Iris, an asteroid
 Infrared interferometer spectrometer and radiometer, an instrument used in the Voyager space program
 Interface Region Imaging Spectrograph, a space probe to observe the Sun
 Iris Nebula, a reflection nebula and Caldwell object in the constellation Cepheus
 International Radiation Investigation Satellite, an early satellite to study radiation in space
 Internet Routing in Space, an Internet router on a satellite

Biology and medicine
 Iris (anatomy), part of the eye
 Iris (insect), a genus of praying mantis
 Iris (plant), a genus of flowering plants
 Iris (psychedelic), a psychedelic drug
 Iris glossy-starling, the emerald starling (Lamprotornis iris)
 Immune reconstitution inflammatory syndrome, a complication of HIV treatment

Computing

Computing hardware
 IRIS (biosensor), an interferometric high-throughput biosensor
 Iris Mote, a wireless sensor node
 Iris printer, an inkjet printer
 SGI IRIS, a line of computer terminals and workstations
 HTC Iris, a smartphone manufactured by High Tech Computer Corporation
 Intel HD, UHD and Iris Graphics, a series of integrated graphics processors
 Internet Routing in Space, a space-capable IP router

Software
 IRIS (astronomical software), an image processing application
 IRIS (transportation software), an Advanced Traffic Management System
 Iris Associates, an American software company, developer of Lotus Notes
 Iris Browser, a web browser
 IRIS GL, a graphics application programming interface
 IRIS Workspace, a graphically organized iconic desktop environment
 Incident Resource Inventory System (IRIS), a distributed software tool provided by the Federal Emergency Management Agency (FEMA)

Other uses in computing
 Iris Challenge Evaluation, a series of NIST events to promote iris recognition technology
 Iris Recognition Immigration System, an electronic border control system
 Information Systems Research in Scandinavia, a non-profit organization in Scandinavia
 Iris flower data set, a standard example data set for use in statistics (and related software)

Weapons
 IRIS (jamming device), an Estonian weapon
 IRIS-T, a German air-to-air missile
 Shahab-4 or IRIS, an Iranian liquid propelled missile

Other uses in science and technology

 Iris (diaphragm), a mechanical device in optical systems
 Tropical Storm Iris (disambiguation), three tropical cyclones in the Atlantic Ocean
 IRIS Consortium, a seismology research project
 Institute for Research in Information and Scholarship, a Brown University program
 Internal rotary inspection system, a pipe testing method
 International Reactor Innovative and Secure, a nuclear reactor design
 IRIS, aggregated units for statistical information in French census mapping

Transportation

Aircraft

 Abraham Iris, a 1930s French touring airplane
 Blackburn Iris, a 1920s British biplane flying boat

Automobiles
 Iris (car), a British car brand manufactured 1906–1925
 Desert Iris, a Jordanian 4x4 strategic auxiliary vehicle
 Tata Magic Iris, an Indian microvan
 Wallyscar Iris, a Tunisian mini SUV

Engines
 IRIS engine, a design for a type of internal combustion engine
 de Havilland Iris, a British four-cylinder, liquid-cooled, horizontally opposed aero engine

Rail
 Iris (train), an international express train in Europe
 International Railway Industry Standard; see Union des Industries Ferroviaires Européennes

Watercraft
 , for any of several ships by that name
 French ship Iris, the name of several vessels
 HMS Iris, the name of several Royal Navy ships
 MV Royal Iris, a ferry operating until 1991
 USS Iris, the name of several U.S. Navy ships
 MV Royal Iris of the Mersey, a ferry operating since 2001
 IRIS, the prefix for Iranian naval vessels since 1979; see List of current ships of the Islamic Republic of Iran Navy

Other uses
 Iris (color), an ambiguous color term, usually referring to shades ranging from blue-violet to violet
 Iris (mythology), a Greek goddess
 Incident Resource Inventory System (IRIS), a distributed software tool provided by the Federal Emergency Management Agency (FEMA)
 Insurance Regulatory Information System, a database of insurance companies in the United States

See also
 Iris Award (disambiguation)
 Iris II (disambiguation)